The release of the anti-Islamic short film Innocence of Muslims triggered numerous demonstrations across North Africa, the Middle East and South Asia. On September 11, 2012, dozens of protestors scaled the walls and entered the courtyard of the U.S. embassy in Cairo, Egypt. On September 13, 2012 protests occurred at the U.S. embassy in Sana'a, Yemen, resulting in the deaths of four protesters and injuries to thirty-five protesters and guards. On September 14, the U.S. consulate in Chennai was attacked, resulting in injuries to twenty-five protesters. Protesters in Tunis, Tunisia, climbed the U.S. embassy walls and set trees on fire. At least four people were killed and forty-six injured during protests in Tunis on September 15. Further protests were held at U.S. diplomatic missions and other locations in the days following the initial attacks. Related protests and attacks resulted in numerous deaths and injuries across the Middle East, Africa, Pakistan, and Afghanistan.

The 2012 Benghazi attack occurred during the night after protesters penetrated the grounds of the U.S. embassy in Cairo. For days after the attack, CIA analysts believed the Benghazi incident had been “spontaneously inspired” by the Cairo incident, which Benghazi residents could view on an Egyptian satellite television service, though analysts later concluded the attack had been planned in advance. On the day after the attack, Ansar al-Sharia claimed partial responsibility, though it also said "it was a spontaneous popular uprising in response to what happened by the West." The early conflicting accounts generated significant political controversy during subsequent investigations through 2015.

Background

Context of reactions

The late 20th and early 21st centuries have seen several major incidents of the Islamic world taking offence at pictorial or written representation of Muhammad and his teachings. In practice people have been brought to trial, killed or had a fatwa called on them for a wide range of acts that have been cited as blasphemous, including depicting Mohammad either in writing or in some other manner that was perceived as insulting.

Background

A trailer for a movie called Innocence of Muslims, described by Reuters as depicting the Islamic prophet, Muhammad "as a fool, a philanderer and a religious fake" and showed him having sex, was uploaded to YouTube in early July 2012, and an Arabic-dubbed version uploaded to YouTube on September 4, 2012. NBC News described the trailer as depicting Muhammad "as a womanizer, a homosexual, and a child abuser." The film was supported by the U.S. pastor Terry Jones, who had previously angered Muslims by announcing plans to burn the Quran publicly. Reuters cited the broadcast of an excerpt of the trailer on Egyptian TV network Al-Nas on September 8, on a show hosted by  Sheikh Khalad Abdalla, as "the flashpoint for the unrest." Prior to the 2011 revolution, Egyptian authorities periodically suspended al-Nas for "promoting religious or sectarian hatred."

On September 11, hours before the attacks, in response to the promotion of the film and in anticipation of protests, the U.S. Embassy in Cairo issued the following statement:

The statement was no longer online as of September 13, 2012.

Movement for Omar Abdel-Rahman

On June 29, newly elected Egyptian President Mohamed Morsi pledged to free Omar Abdel-Rahman, whom he described as a political prisoner. On August 2, Egypt formally requested that the United States release Abdel-Rahman.

On August 30, according to Eric Trager, al-Gama'a al-Islamiyya called for a protest at the US embassy in Cairo on September 11 to demand the release of Abdel-Rahman.

On September 8, El Fagr reported on a threat to burn down the US embassy in Cairo unless Abdel-Rahman was released. Raymond Ibrahim described this threat as a unified statement by Egyptian Islamic Jihad and al-Gama'a al-Islamiyya.

A DHS report released on September 11 and reported by Fox News on September 19 indicated that a web statement incited "sons of Egypt" to pressure America to release Abdel-Rahman "even if it requires burning the embassy down with everyone in it." The Web statement was apparently posted on an Arabic-language forum on September 9, two days before the attack, and was in reference to the embassy in Egypt.

Protests at diplomatic missions

Widespread protests followed screening of excerpts of the trailer in Egypt. Many of the protests were focused on United States embassies and consular posts, with some leading to violent confrontations.

Egypt
In Egypt, the protest was organized by Wesam Abdel-Wareth, a Salafist leader and president of Egypt's Hekma television channel, who called for a gathering on September 11 at 5 pm in front of the United States Embassy, to protest against a film that he thought was named Muhammad's Trial. However, Eric Trager, an experts at the Washington Institute for Near East Policy, has said that the protest was in fact announced on August 30 by Jamaa Islamiya, to release Sheikh Omar Abdel Rahman. After the trailer for the film began circulating, Nader Bakkar, the Egyptian Salafist Nour Party's spokesman, and Muhammad al-Zawahiri, the brother of al-Qaeda leader Ayman al Zawihiri, called for Egyptians to assemble outside of the American embassy.

About 3,000 demonstrators, many of them from the ultraconservative Salafist movement, responded to his call. A dozen men were then reported to have scaled the embassy walls, after which one of them tore down the flag of the United States of America and replaced it with a black Islamist flag with the inscription of the shahada: "There is no god but Allah and Muhammad is the messenger of Allah". Some of the protesters also wrote "There is no God but Allah" on the compound walls. According to Sherine Tadros of Al Jazeera, the protestors demanded that the film be taken "out of circulation" and that some of the protestors would stay at the site until that happens. Thousands of Egyptian riot police were at the embassy following the breach of the walls; they eventually persuaded the trespassers to leave the compound without the use of force. After that, only a few hundred protesters remained outside the compound. Reports that the United States Marines were not allowed to carry live ammunition by the State Department were later proven to be incorrect.

Egypt's prime minister Hesham Kandil said "a number" of protesters later confessed to getting paid to participate. He did not say whether the government knew or suspected who paid the protesters.

On September 14, in the town of Sheikh Zuwayed in the Sinai Peninsula, protesters stormed a compound of the Multinational Force and Observers, designed to monitor the peace treaty between Egypt and Israel. The peacekeeping force opened fire on the protesters. Two members of the peacekeeping force were wounded.

Ahmad Fouad Ashoush, a Salafist Muslim cleric, issued a fatwa saying: "I issue a fatwa and call on the Muslim youth in America and Europe to do this duty, which is to kill the director, the producer and the actors and everyone who helped and promoted the film." Another Muslim cleric, Ahmed Abdullah (a.k.a. Abu Islam) tore up the Bible and threw the torn pages on the ground during the September 11 embassy attack.

Yemen
In Yemen, the protests started on September 13, after Abdul Majid al-Zindani, a cleric and former mentor to Osama bin Laden, called on followers to emulate the attacks in Egypt and Libya.

Hours later, protesters had stormed the grounds of the U.S. embassy in Sana'a. Police fired into the air in an attempt to hold back the crowds, but failed to prevent them from gaining access to the compound and setting fire to vehicles. Guards in Sana'a used tear gas and a water cannon to drive back the crowd. At least 5 protesters were killed and 11 others injured; 24 guards were also injured.

The U.S. responded by sending a Marine FAST unit to Yemen.

Greece
About 600 Muslim protestors in Athens tried to march on the U. S. Embassy, but were stopped by Greek police. No injuries were reported, although three cars were damaged and three storefronts were smashed. One protester claimed "we are all with Osama" and called on the US to hang the filmmaker.

Sudan
In anticipation of protests, Sudanese authorities deployed "many, many riot police" near the American embassy in Khartoum. Nevertheless, on September 14, protesters breached the outside wall of the compound and clashed with guards; three people were killed.

Also after Friday prayers on September 14, protesters started fires and tore down the flag in the German embassy. Demonstrators hoisted a black Islamic flag at the German embassy, which read in white letters "there is no God but Allah and Mohammed is his Prophet". Although it was initially assumed that the attacks were to a target of opportunity related to the protests against the film Innocence of Muslims, the incident is now reported as a long-planned deliberate attack against Germany; preachers encouraged the riots by referring to Germany's defending Danish cartoonist Kurt Westergaard in 2012 during the Jyllands-Posten Muhammad cartoons controversy. Referring to a demonstration in August 2012 by right-winged German protesters during which pictures of Mohammed were shown, the Sudanese foreign minister justified the attacks by saying that German chancellor Angela Merkel had allowed these demonstrations to proceed and had thereby encouraged "an insult to Islam and clearly violated all rules of religious coexistence and tolerance."

The neighboring British embassy was also attacked, with two people killed in clashes with the police.

Tunisia
In Tunis, on September 14, protesters entered the compound of the U.S. embassy after climbing the embassy walls and set trees inside the compound ablaze. The protesters attacked the American Cooperative School of Tunis and set it on fire. At least 4 were killed and 46 injured during protests near the embassy on September 15. The U.S. government pulled out all non-essential personnel and urged its citizens to leave the city.

India
On September 14, the U.S. consulate in Chennai, India, was attacked, with protestors throwing stones and footwear at the consulate. Police dispersed the crowd, causing minor injuries to 25 protesters. The Consulate asked American citizens to enroll in the STEP program, asked American citizens to follow the local news and media and ceased the consulate's operation temporarily. Additional Police protection for the consulate was also granted by the Tamil Nadu Government.

Indonesia
On September 17, up to 500 protesters, many of whom were part of the Islamic Defenders Front and Majelis Mujahideen Indonesia attacked the United States embassy in Jakarta by throwing stones and loose pavement, some reports also state that petrol bombs were used in the attacks. In addition to attacking the embassy, protesters attacked the local police force and embassy guards.

Pakistan
Pakistan witnessed widespread protests all across the country. On September 14, security forces clashed with demonstrators outside the U.S. embassy in Islamabad over Innocence of Muslims. Protesters called for the execution of the filmmaker and urged Islamabad to close the US Embassy and expel its diplomats. In the eastern city of Lahore, demonstrators burned the US flag outside the U.S. consulate and shouted slogans against the United States and Israel. On September 16, Voice of America News reported that police fired tear gas and water cannon at hundreds of demonstrators as they approached the heavily guarded consulate in the southern city of Karachi. On September 19, a businessman who was unwilling to participate in the protests was charged for blasphemy. On September 20, CNN reported that protests continued in Karachi, where according to a police official about "100 small children" repeated anti-American slogans during a protest. Video showed children repeating an adult voice, "Death to America" and "Any friend of America is a traitor." The children, between the ages of 6 and 8, demonstrated across from the Karachi Press Club, led by "at least four teachers." In Islamabad, police used tear gas and fired warning shots into the air to disperse the crowd. Islamabad Police Chief Bin Yamin said eight police were injured. On September 21, a public holiday was held in Pakistan as protests under the banner of "Love our prophet" were held across the country. The newspaper Dawn reported that at least 23 people were killed during the day. In Karachi, a crowd of 15,000 torched "six cinemas, three Hindu temples, two banks, a post office and 5 police vehicles" whilst some fired on police, killing two police officers. It was further reported that 10 of the protesters were shot dead afterwards. Meanwhile, in Peshawar, four protesters and a policeman were killed. Ghulam Ahmed Bilour, a Pakistani cabinet minister has announced a $100,000 bounty for killing Nakoula Basseley Nakoula. The Pakistani government has sought to distance itself from this award. Some British MPs have called for a ban on Bilour's visits to Britain. On September 23, a rampaging mob of protesters in Mardan reportedly "set on fire the church, St Paul's high school, a library, a computer laboratory and houses of four clergymen, including Bishop Peter Majeed." and went on to rough up Zeeshan Chand, the pastor's son.

Benghazi 

In Benghazi, Libya, heavily armed attackers killed the U.S. Ambassador J. Christopher Stevens and three other Americans on September 11. In eleven drafts of "talking points" through September 15, the CIA assessed that the attack was "spontaneously inspired by the protests at the U.S. Embassy in Cairo." Some U.S. officials, speaking under anonymity, said that they believed the Benghazi attack was coordinated and planned in advance, and not prompted by the video. On the night of the attack, the State Department Operations Center emailed the White House and Pentagon that Ansar al-Sharia had taken responsibility for the attack, although the next day the group issued a statement saying it "didn't participate as a sole entity; rather, it was a spontaneous popular uprising in response to what happened by the West," an apparent reference to the release of the video. Al-Qaeda also claimed responsibility and said it was in revenge for a U.S. drone strike which killed Libyan Abu Yahya al-Libi, an al-Qaeda leader. The role of the video in motivating the attack quickly became an ongoing dispute in the American political arena. Numerous eyewitnesses reported that the attackers said they were motivated by the video.  Though Libyan officials initially stated that hundreds of protesters had been present before the attack, later investigations by the U.S. government concluded that no protest took place prior to the attack. In eleven drafts of "talking points" that reflected evolving intelligence, the CIA initially assessed that the attack was "spontaneously inspired by the protests at the U.S. Embassy in Cairo" that occurred hours earlier and had been triggered by the release of the video. During the hours before the attack, Egyptian satellite television networks popular in Benghazi had been covering the outrage over the video.

Other protests

Egyptian TV host Sheikh Khaled Abdullah, in his broadcast of September 8 on Al-Nas television, criticized the film's depiction of Muhammad. Egyptian President Mohamed Morsi urged the United States government to prosecute the film producers whom he referred to as "madmen". The U.S. Embassy in Cairo issued a statement condemning what it called "continuing efforts by misguided individuals to hurt the religious feelings of Muslims," an apparent reference to the video.

The showings of the film's trailer resulted in massive and sometimes violent protests and deaths and hundreds of injuries in several cities in the world. The government of Pakistan declared a national holiday in honour of the Prophet and called for peaceful protests against the film. On September 17, about 500,000 Lebanese protested in Beirut at a rally where Hezbollah leader Hassan Nasrallah made a rare public appearance, calling for sustained protests against the film, calling the protests the "start of a serious movement in defense of the prophet." American diplomats at the U.S. Embassy in Beirut began destroying classified material as a security measure.

On September 12, YouTube announced that it had "temporarily restricted access" to the video in Egypt and Libya. Afghanistan and Iran decided to censor YouTube and Afghanistan President Hamid Karzai said the makers of the film committed a "devilish act". Several news services have reported that "Bacile" has gone into hiding fearing that current actions could be used as an excuse to harm him, and that he continued to defend the film. Saying he was sorry for the death of Stevens, "Bacile" blamed the consulate's security system. Klein rejected any blame for the violent reaction to the movie, saying, "Do I feel guilty that these people were incited? Guess what? I didn't incite them. They're pre-incited, they're pre-programmed to do this."

On September 18, a female suicide bomber drove a car filled with explosives into a mini-bus with foreign aviation workers in Afghanistan, killing at least nine people, reportedly including eight South Africans and a British woman and possibly also a number of Afghans.  The Islamist militant group Hizb-i-Islami claimed responsibility for the attack, which was the first reported suicide bombing by a woman in the country, and said it was in response to the film. The Taliban said they attacked the British military base Camp Bastion on September 14, killing two American soldiers, in a response to the film, and later claimed the base was chosen because Prince Harry was there.

The film has been condemned by the Coptic Orthodox Christian Church. Bishop Serapion of the Coptic Orthodox Diocese of Los Angeles said in a statement that it "rejects dragging the respectable Copts of the Diaspora in the latest production of an inflammatory movie about the prophet of Islam ... The name of our blessed parishioners should not be associated with the efforts of individuals who have ulterior motives." In addition, the World Council of Churches stated that the film was "an insult to the heart of the Muslim faith" and "to all peoples of faith."

ADL's Abraham Foxman said, "We are greatly concerned that this false notion that an Israeli Jew and 100 Jewish backers were behind the film now has legs and is gathering speed around the world. [...] In an age where conspiracy theories, especially ones of an anti-Semitic nature, explode on the Internet in a matter of minutes, it is crucial for those news organizations who initially reported on his identity to correct the record." Foxman specifically criticized "news organizations across the Arab world and anti-Semites and anti-Israel activists" for continuing to describe the filmmaker and backers as Jewish despite the fact that no Jews were involved in the making of the film.

While Bacile was neither Israeli nor Jewish, the Iranian state-linked Press TV cited the initial reports for the film. Iran's supreme leader, Ayatollah Ali Khamenei, evoked "evil Zionists" and the United States for creating the film. Rabbi Abraham Cooper condemned initial reports that the film was backed by Jewish donors and said that the media did not thoroughly research this claim. Cooper said that to "catapult what might be a nonexistent Jewish element could lead to violence against Jews," and called on the media to learn from this incident, while investigating who exactly created the film.

Sky News said the video was "anti-Muslim" and "designed to enrage". According to Reuters, the video portrays Muhammad as a "fool, a philanderer and a religious fake"; NBC News said the trailer depicted Muhammad "as a womanizer, a homosexual and a child abuser." Time magazine described the dialogue during the scene with a donkey as "homoerotic". According to the BBC, Muhammad's followers are portrayed as "savage killers hungry for wealth and bent on killing women and children."

The New Republic said that the film "includes not a single artistically redeemable aspect" with "atrocious" directing, "terrible" sets and acting consisting of "blank eyes and strained line readings". The New York Daily News called it an "obscenely inept vanity project" that is "far beneath any reasonable standard of movie-making." Muslim filmmaker Kamran Pasha stated, "I am of the opinion that it is a film of questionable artistic merit, backed by a group of bitter bigots whose only agenda was to incite hatred and violence by smearing the character of Prophet Muhammad." Salman Rushdie called the filmmaker "outrageous and unpleasant and disgusting", and characterized the production as "clearly a malevolent piece of garbage."

Africa

Americas

Central, South and East Asia

Europe

Middle East and North Africa

Oceania

Related attacks

Afghanistan

Afghanistan's Taliban claimed responsibility on the Camp Bastion attack in southern Helmand province which U.S. officials said killed two American Marines, saying it was in response to Innocence of Muslims. Camp Bastion, in southern Helmand province, came under mortar, rocket-propelled grenade and small arms fire late on September 14. Nearly 20 insurgents disguised as US troops breached the base and destroyed several hangars and fueling facilities. Before they were all killed or captured, the insurgents also managed to destroy six jet fighters and damage two others.

A suicide bomber killed 14 people on September 18. A spokesman for an Afghan insurgent group, Hezb-i-Islami, claimed responsibility for the bombing and said it was carried out by an 18-year-old woman "in response to the film insulting the Prophet Muhammad and Islam."

In Afghanistan, the Dadullah faction of the Afghan taliban has put a bounty of 8 kilograms of gold, worth about $487,000 for the death of the film's creators.

Egypt–Israel border attack

On September 21, 2012, an Egyptian militant group attacked Israeli soldiers near the Egypt-Israel border, killing one Israeli. In the ensuing gunfight between the Israeli Caracal Battalion and the militants, three militants were killed. The militant group cited the video as their motive for the attack.

Reactions to diplomatic missions attacks

Various nations have released statements in response to the attacks and to Innocence of Muslims. These comments variously included condemnation of the attacks and condemnations of the video. The president of the United States, Barack Obama, addressed the dilemma by giving a speech after the protests and attacks, where he showed his respect toward Islam and tried to advocate for mutual respect. However, Obama also stated that America will not tolerate any acts of terror.

See also

 2011 Mazar-i-Sharif attack
 2012 Sydney anti-Islam film protests
 Chronology of the reactions to Innocence of Muslims
 List of attacks on diplomatic missions

Notes

References

External links

 Barack Obama: A Detailed Response to Benghazi
 
 Provocation and protest collected news and commentary at Al Jazeera English
 U.S. Embassies, Consulates, and Diplomatic Missions
 Map of known protests at Google Maps

2012 in Egypt
Benghazi
2012 in Yemen
Aftermath of the First Libyan Civil War
Anti-Americanism
Anti-Japanese sentiment
Anti-communism
Innocence of Muslims, reactions
Islamism
Works about Islamic terrorism
Islam-related controversies
Egypt–United States relations
Libya–United States relations
United States–Yemen relations
2012 in international relations
Arab–American relations
Terrorist incidents in 2012
Islam and violence
Reactions to 2010s events
YouTube controversies
Film controversies
September 2012 crimes